Nedbank Cup is a South African club football (soccer) tournament. The knockout tournament, based on the English FA Cup format, was one of a weak opponent facing a stronger one. The competition was sponsored by ABSA until 2007, after which Nedbank took over sponsorship.

Format
The 16 Premier Soccer League clubs, 8 National First Division teams, as well as 8 teams from the amateur ranks compete for the prize money of R6 million. The winner also qualifies for the CAF Confederation Cup.

The teams are not seeded at any stage, and the first 16 sides drawn out of the hat receive a home-ground advantage. There are no longer any replays in the tournament, and any games which end in a draw after 90 minutes are subject to 30 minutes extra time followed by penalties if necessary.

Teams
The 32 teams competing in the Nedbank Cup competition are: (listed according to the league that they are playing in).

Premier Soccer League

 Ajax Cape Town
 AmaZulu
 Bidvest Wits  
 Black Leopards 
 Bloemfontein Celtic
 Free State Stars
 Golden Arrows
 Jomo Cosmos
 Kaizer Chiefs
 Mamelodi Sundowns
 Moroka Swallows
 Orlando Pirates
 Platinum Stars
 Santos
 Supersport United
 Thanda Royal Zulu

National First Division

 FC Cape Town
 Nathi Lions
 Ikapa Sporting
 Mpumalanga Black Aces
 Winners Park
 Durban Stars
 FC AK
 Vasco Da Gama

Vodacom League

 Yebo Yes United
 Matatiel Professionals
 Peace Lovers
 African Warriors
 Inspection FC
 Bloemfontein Young Tigers
 North West Shining Stars
 Young Ones

Results

Bracket

First round (round of 32)

Matches

Teams Qualified for Second round 

 Kaizer Chiefs (PSL)
 Jomo Cosmos (PSL)
 Mamelodi Sundowns (PSL)
 Free State Stars (PSL)
 Santos (PSL)
 AmaZulu (PSL)
 Moroka Swallows (PSL)
 Black Leopards (PSL)
 Winners Park (NFD)
 FC Cape Town (NFD)
 FC AK (NFD)
 Nathi Lions (NFD)
 Ikapa Sporting (NFD)
 Vasco Da Gama (NFD)
 Mpumalanga Black Aces (NFD)
 Matatiel Professionals (Vodacom League)

Second round (round of 16)

Teams Qualified for Quarter-finals 

 AmaZulu (PSL)
 Black Leopards (PSL)
 Free State Stars (PSL) 
 Mamelodi Sundowns (PSL) 
 Santos (PSL)   
 FC Cape Town  (NFD)
 Mpumalanga Black Aces (NFD) 
 Nathi Lions (NFD)

Quarter-finals

Teams Qualified for Semi-finals 

 Mamelodi Sundowns (PSL)
 Free State Stars (PSL)
 AmaZulu (PSL) 
 Mpumalanga Black Aces (NFD)

Semi-finals

Teams Qualified for Finals 

 Mamelodi Sundowns (PSL)
 Mpumalanga Black Aces (NFD)

Finals

References

External links
Nedbank Cup Official Website
Nedbank Official Website
Premier Soccer League
South African Football Association
Confederation of African Football

Nedbank Cup
Nedbank Cup, 2008
2008